Hungarian Ohioans are Hungarian Americans living in Ohio. Their number was 203,417 in 2010 and 183,593 in 2014. Fairport Harbor, Ohio is 11.8% Hungarian American. In Cleveland and its neighboring areas there live more than 107,000 Hungarians, of which over 7,400 speak the language, the third highest number in the nation. Some resources stated that there was time when Cleveland was the second greatest Hungarian settlement outside Budapest. Most of the Hungarians live in Cuyahoga County, Ohio, where they make up 3.1% of the total population. There is also a large colony of Hungarians in Toledo, Ohio. Two former local representatives reside in Toledo: Peter Ujvagi and Matt Szollosi. In Toledo, one can find the famous Tony Packo's Cafe. There is a part of Columbus, which is called Hungarian Village.

History
During the 19th and the 20th century a lot of Hungarian people immigrated to the United States, and one of the final destinations was Ohio. In 1900, there were about 17,000 Hungarians in Ohio. By 1920 their number grew to 73,181. Although they arrived before the First World War, there were still two large waves of Hungarian immigration: after the Second World War and after the Hungarian Revolution of 1956. In more recent decades, the Hungarian communities started melting and moving to other places in Ohio, but their presence is still significant.

Hungarians in Cleveland

Most of the Hungarian immigrants settled down on the coastline of Lake Erie and in Cleveland, particularly along Buckeye Road, a neighborhood once nicknamed Little Hungary, which at one time boasted the largest population of Hungarians outside Budapest. At the end of the 19th century there already were six Hungarian communities in Cleveland which organized their own churches. In 1900 precisely 9,558 Hungarian lived in Cleveland, which meant the 8% of the non-aboriginal population of the city. By 1920 their number grew to 43,134 (18% of the non-aboriginal population). Theodor Kuntz, who arrived in 1873, founded a factory where 2,500 Hungarians worked. Soon he became one of the wealthiest men in Cleveland. In 1890 he raised a Hungaria Hall on Clark Avenue. The building is still standing as of 2010.

In 1920, there were more than 300 Hungarian-owned factories and 81 associations in Cleveland. Between 1947 and 1953, 6,000 Hungarians settled in the city; the earlier Hungarians immigrants helped them to assimilate. In the 1980s there were 113,000 Hungarians in Cleveland, but by 1990 the number fell to 61,681. At that time 924 Hungarian organizations were present in Cleveland.

Notable people

 Rich Badar - American football player
 Harold Balazs - sculptor
 Zoltán Tibor Balogh - mathematician
 Jim Bede - aircraft designer
 Steven Boyer - actor
 George Buza - actor
 Jesse Csincsak - snowboarder
 Larry Csonka - American football player
 Joe Eszterhas - screenwriter
 Andy Farkas - American football player
 Elmer Gedeon - American baseball player
 Lou Groza - American football player
 Julie Hamos - Illinois representative
 Les Horvath - American football player
 Robert Ivany - president of the University of St. Thomas in Houston
 Chris Jansing (born Christine Kapostasy) - news correspondent
 Oszkár Jászi - university teacher
 Iggy Katona - stock car racer
 Butch Komives - Professional basketball player
 William Konyha - carpenter, labor leader
 Bernie Kosar - American football player
 Joseph Kosuth - conceptual artist
 Joe Kovacs - athlete
 Jordan Kovacs - American football player
 Kálmán Kubinyi - etcher
 Greg Mancz - American football player
 Dave Meggyesy - American football player
 Zoltan Mesko - American football player
 Nick Nemeth - wrestler
 Paul Newman - actor
 Tom Orosz - American football player
 Michael Pataki - actor
 Jack Rudnay - American football player
 Don Shula - football coach
 Joanne Siegel (born Kovacs) - model
 Matt Szollosi - Ohio representative
 Lajos Takács - Mathematician and Pioneer in Queueing Theory
 Judy Takács - artist
 Kevin Toth - athlete
 Peter Wolf Toth - sculptor
 Mitch Trubisky - NFL Quarterback
 Peter Ujvagi - Ohio representative
 Richard S. Varga - mathematician
 Ted Wass - actor, director

See also
 St. Michael Byzantine Catholic Church Toledo

References

External links
 Hungarian Ohioans
 Cleveland Hungarian Museum
 Hungarian Cultural Center of Northeastern Ohio

Hungarian-American history
 
Lists of people from Ohio
Ethnic groups in Ohio